Lopadium (commonly known as the granular lichen) is a genus of lichen-forming fungi in the monotypic family Lopadiaceae, which is in the order Lecideales. The genus contains 10 species. Lopadium was circumscribed by German lichenologist Gustav Wilhelm Körber in 1855.

Species
Lopadium brisbanense 
Lopadium coralloideum 
Lopadium disciforme 
Lopadium hepaticicola 
Lopadium lecanorellum 
Lopadium nigrum 
Lopadium patwardhanii 
Lopadium pezizoideum 
Lopadium pulchrum 
Lopadium subcoralloideum

References

Lecideales
Lichen genera
Lecideales genera
Taxa named by Gustav Wilhelm Körber
Taxa described in 1855